Christian Elliott (born November 11, 1997) is an American sport shooter. He won the gold medal in the men's skeet event at the 2019 Pan American Games held in Lima, Peru.

References

External links 
 

Living people
1997 births
Place of birth missing (living people)
American male sport shooters
Skeet shooters
Pan American Games medalists in shooting
Pan American Games gold medalists for the United States
Shooters at the 2019 Pan American Games
Medalists at the 2019 Pan American Games
20th-century American people
21st-century American people